Phenazolam, (Clobromazolam, DM-II-90, BRN 4550445) is a benzodiazepine derivative which acts as a potent sedative and hypnotic drug. It was first invented in the early 1980s, but was never developed for medical use. It has been sold over the internet as a designer drug, first being identified in seized samples by a laboratory in Sweden in March 2016.

Legality
Clobromazolam was made illegal in Serbia in May 2019, and in Italy in March 2020.

See also
 Bromazolam
 Clonazolam
 Flubromazolam
 Phenazepam
 SH-I-048A
 Triazolam

References 

Bromoarenes
Chloroarenes
GABAA receptor positive allosteric modulators
Triazolobenzodiazepines